Short-Term Memories is the first studio album by the Canadian indie pop band The Salteens released in 2000 on Endearing Records.

Track listing

References 

2000 albums
The Salteens albums